The National Guard Armory is a history armory building at DeQueen and Maple Streets in Mena, Arkansas.  It is a large single-story Art Deco building, fashioned out of fieldstone and concrete in 1931.  It is the best example in Mena of a stone building style more typically found in the more mountainous surrounding areas.  It was designed by Derwood F. Kyle of Pine Bluff, and was from the start designed to include community meeting spaces, a function the building continues to perform.

The building was listed on the National Register of Historic Places in 1991.

See also
National Register of Historic Places listings in Polk County, Arkansas

References

Military facilities on the National Register of Historic Places in Arkansas
Infrastructure completed in 1931
Art Deco architecture in Arkansas
Buildings and structures in Polk County, Arkansas
Military installations in Arkansas
Armories on the National Register of Historic Places
National Register of Historic Places in Polk County, Arkansas